The Popular Action (AP) is a liberal and reformist political party in Peru, founded by former Peruvian president Fernando Belaúnde Terry.

History

Early history 
Fernando Belaúnde founded Popular Action (Acción Popular) in 1956 as a reformist alternative to the status quo conservative forces and the populist American Popular Revolutionary Alliance party.

Although Belaúnde's message was not all that different from APRA's, his tactics were more inclusive and less confrontational. He was able to appeal to some of the same political base as APRA, primarily the middle class, but also to a wider base of professionals and white-collar workers. It also advocated scientific advancement and technocracy, a policy set that it took from the Progressive Social Movement, a splinter party which it eventually absorbed. The AP had significant electoral success, attaining the presidency in 1963 and 1980, but the party was more of an electoral machine for the persona of Belaúnde than an institutionalized organization. The AP was initially reckoned as a center-left party.  However, by the 1980s, Peru's political spectrum had shifted sharply leftward, and the AP found itself on the center-right.

Later years 
After AP's second administration, in 1985, the party was defeated by the APRA party, gaining only 6.4 percent of the vote. In 1990 AP participated in the elections as a part of the Democratic Front, a center-right coalition headed by Mario Vargas Llosa.

In 2000, Víctor Andrés García Belaúnde was selected as the presidential nominee, being the worst general election for AP, gaining only 0.42% of the popular vote. Only 3 AP congressman were elected. As many assume the election was a fraud, Fujimori resigned after the corruption of his government was revealed by the opposition.

AP member Valentín Paniagua would become President of the Congress in November 2000 for a few days and, after the fall of the Fujimori administration, became the interim President of the Republic, holding office from November 2000 to July 2001.

At the 8 April 2001 election, the party won 4.2% of the popular vote and 3 out of 120 seats in Congress.

Likewise, in 2002, regional elections were held for the first time, which aimed to elect Regional Presidents for the 25 departments of Peru. In that sense, party participation was quite high (15 political groups). In these elections, AP ranked sixth by number of votes.

For the 2006 national election, the party joined forces with Somos Perú and Coordinadora Nacional de Independientes to form the Frente de Centro coalition. Paniagua was the presidential candidate, while the vice-presidential candidates belonged to AP's allies. The Center Front ended in the fifth place in the national election, with 5.6% of the popular vote.

For the 2011 national election, the party joined forces with Somos Perú and Perú Possible to form the Peru Possible Alliance. The presidential candidate was former Peru's president and leader of Perú Possible, Alejandro Toledo. The alliance ended in the fourth place in the national election, with 15.6% of the popular vote.

For the 2016 national election, the party ran alone for the first time since 2000, when Congressman Víctor Andrés García Belaúnde ran against the sitting president Alberto Fujimori, and it was the first time since 2006 that Popular Action participated with a party member as a presidential candidate, when former President Valentín Paniagua ran for office. The presidential candidate was Alfredo Barnechea, journalist and political analyst, who won the party's primaries with 52% of the votes, defeating Mesías Guevara (40%), the party's president for the 2014–2018 term, the lawyer Beatríz Mejía (6%) and former Deputy Alejandro Montoya (2%). Popular Action ended in fourth place in the national election, with 6.97% of the popular vote. This was the best result for Popular Action since 1985. For the 2016–2021 term, AP had five congressmen out of 130 representing the party, until the snap election in 2020, when it increased its representation to 25 congressmen until the end of the 2016–2021 term. In the 2021 elections, Lescano placed 5th in a fractured race of 18 candidates while the party gained 16 seats for the 2021–2026 congressional term. On 26 July 2021, an alliance led by Popular Action member María del Carmen Alva successfully negotiated an agreement to gain control of Peru's Congress.

Doctrine 
Acciopopulismo is the name that has been given to the party's ideological doctrine. It is pointed out that the main feature of his thinking is a situational humanism.

Acciopopulismo considers that the role of the State should be limited to regulating and encouraging private enterprise and sustainable development. Within the main feature of his theory, situational humanism, it considers in the Peruvian case that it is specifically inspired by what has been called "Peru as Doctrine".

It affirms that the proclamation is of a "democratic, nationalist and revolutionary" court:

 Democratic, inasmuch as it respects, disseminates and defends the democratic system.
 Nationalist, in that it promotes local traditions and economic and cultural development.
 Revolutionary, inasmuch as it aspires to keeping up-to-date with the new modernity and rapid change that improves social and cultural structures.

The idea of "Peru as Doctrine" is based on the values and principles arising from the historical and cultural particularity in which Peru developed but which have universal significance. An important part of their doctrine is developed in what they call Popular Cooperation.

In Peruvian political history it has happened that on occasions the right has called Popular Action a leftist party (first government) or that the left has called it a right-wing party (second government). Towards the end of the 1960s, a radicalized sector split from the party (the so-called "hotheads"), forming Acción Popular Socialista (Manuel Seoane, Gustavo Mohme, among other intellectuals).

Likewise, a significant percentage of the so-called "young Turks" (or "chapulines"/grasshoppers, young acciopopulistas of the early 1980s), at the beginning of the 1990s migrated to liberal political positions (to the Liberty Movement and then to Fujimorism). These are the two biggest party losses suffered by this party. Consequently, from then on, Popular Action is generally identified with positions of the center, with factions of both the progressive left and the conservative right.

Towards the end of the 1990s, the ex-acciopopulista Luis Castañeda Lossio founded the National Solidarity Party, which with an alliance with the Christian People's Party within the National Unity coalition won the municipal elections in the capital, Lima, in 2002.

Presidents of Peru from Popular Action

Fernando Belaúnde Terry (1963–1968; 1980–1985)
Valentín Paniagua (2000–2001)
Manuel Merino (10–15 Nov. 2020)

Electoral history

Presidential

Congress of the Republic

References

External links
Official site
Congress - Popular Action

Political parties established in 1956
Political parties in Peru
1956 establishments in Peru